This is a list of UPA theatrical cartoons featuring Mr. Magoo. Most of the films listed were released by Columbia Pictures, but the final three (Magoo Meets Boing-Boing, Magoo Meets Frankenstein, and I Was a Teenage Magoo) were distributed by UPA themselves.

Cartoons

1949
"Ragtime Bear" (John Hubley)

1950
"Spellbound Hound" (Hubley)
"Trouble Indemnity" (Pete Burness, Hubley)
"Bungled Bungalow" (Burness, Hubley)

1951
"Barefaced Flatfoot" (Hubley)
"Fuddy Duddy Buddy" (Hubley)
"Grizzly Golfer" (Burness)

1952
"Sloppy Jalopy" (Burness)
"The Dog Snatcher" (Burness)
"Pink and Blue Blues" (Burness)
"Hotsy Footsy" (William Hurtz)
"Captains Outrageous" (Burness)

1953
(all cartoons directed by Pete Burness)
"Safety Spin"
"Magoo's Masterpiece"
"Magoo Slept Here"

1954
(all cartoons directed by Pete Burness)
"Magoo Goes Skiing"
"Kangaroo Courting"
"Destination Magoo"
"When Magoo Flew"

1955
(all cartoons directed by Pete Burness)
"Magoo's Check-Up"
"Magoo's Express"
"Madcap Magoo"
"Stage Door Magoo"
"Magoo Makes News"

1956
(all cartoons directed by Pete Burness)
"Magoo's Canine Mutiny"
"Magoo Goes West"
"Calling Doctor Magoo"
"Magoo Beats the Heat"
"Magoo's Puddle Jumper"
"Trailblazer Magoo"
"Magoo's Problem Child"
"Meet Mother Magoo"

1957
"Magoo Goes Overboard" (Burness)
"Matador Magoo" (Burness)
"Magoo Breaks Par" (Burness)
"Magoo's Glorious Fourth" (Burness)
"Magoo's Masquerade" (Rudy Larriva)
"Magoo Saves the Bank" (Burness)
"Rock Hound Magoo" (Burness)
"Magoo's Moose Hunt" (Robert Cannon)
"Magoo's Private War" (Larriva)

1958
"Magoo's Young Manhood" (Burness) 
"Scoutmaster Magoo" (Cannon) 
"The Explosive Mr. Magoo" (Burness) 
"Magoo's Three-Point Landing" (Burness) 
"Magoo's Cruise" (Larriva) 
"Love Comes to Magoo" (Tom McDonald)  
"Gumshoe Magoo" (Gil Turner)

1959
"Bwana Magoo" (McDonald) 
"Magoo's Homecoming" (Turner) 
"Merry Minstrel Magoo" (Larriva) 
"Magoo's Lodge Brother" (Larriva) 
"Terror Faces Magoo" (Jack Goodford, Chris Ishii)
1001 Arabian Nights (Jack Kinney)
 "Magoo Meets Boing Boing (The Noise-Making Boy)" (Abe Levitow)

1960
"Magoo Meets Frankenstein" (Levitow, Turner)
 "I Was a Teenage Magoo" (Clyde Geronimi)

References

 Maltin, Leonard (1980, rev. 1987) Of Mice and Magic: A History of American Animated Cartoons, New York: Plume Books. 
 Shakarian, Pietro. The Columbia Encyc-Crow-Pedia. Retrieved May 13, 2007.

 

Mr. Magoo
Mr. Magoo
 
Lists of animated cartoons